Renève is a commune in the Côte-d'Or department in eastern France, 30 km north east of Dijon. It sits on the Vingeanne river, close to the Canal de Bourgogne.

The town was the site of Queen Brunhilda of Austrasia's torture and execution in 613, the aged monarch being racked for three days, and then torn apart by horses.

Population

See also
Communes of the Côte-d'Or department

References

Communes of Côte-d'Or